Sainte-Marie-du-Bois is a commune in the Mayenne department in north-western France. The town is near the regional park Normandie-Maine, approximately 11 km.

The municipality covers 11.3 km² and had 217 inhabitants in 2017. With a density of 18.6 inhabitants per square kilometre, Sainte-Marie-du-Bois has increased by 0.5% of its population by 1999.

See also
Communes of Mayenne
Parc naturel régional Normandie-Maine

References

Saintemariedubois